Schrei ("Scream") is the debut studio album by German rock band Tokio Hotel. In 2006 they released a partly re-recorded and expanded version, Schrei – so laut du kannst ("Scream – as loud as you can"). The album was only released in Germany, Italy, France, Canada, and Japan. The initial limited edition came with a bonus DVD including the music video for "Durch den Monsun", a special "making of 'Durch den Monsun'" feature, an interview, and a photo gallery.

Because vocalist Bill Kaulitz's voice changed with puberty, the band re-recorded the songs "Schrei", "Rette mich", and "Der Letzte Tag". The version of "Schrei (so laut du kannst)" that is sold in Germany only has the re-recorded version of "Rette mich", while the version sold in France has the re-recorded versions of "Schrei", "Rette mich", "Der Letzte Tag", and acoustic versions of "Schrei" and of "Durch den Monsun."

"Schrei" has sold more than 1,500,000 copies worldwide while "Schrei (so laut du kannst)" has sold 100,000 copies worldwide.

Track listing
Credits adapted from the liner notes of Schrei – so laut du kannst.

Limited Edition Bonus DVD
 Tokio Hotel feature
 Tokio Hotel Interview
 Videoclip "Durch den Monsun"
 Making of "Durch den Monsun"
 Tokio Hotel gallery

Release history

Charts

Weekly charts

Year-end charts

Certifications

Personnel

Performance credits  
 Bill Kaulitz – lead vocals, additional keyboard
 Tom Kaulitz – guitars, piano, backing vocals
 Georg Listing – bass guitar, keyboards, synthesizers, backing vocals
 Gustav Schäfer – drums, percussion

Technical credits  
 Production: Patrick Benzner, Dave Roth, David Jost
 Mixing: Patrick Benzner, Dave Roth
 Mastering: Gateway Mastering
 Photography (Schrei): Sascha Pierro
 Photography (Schrei - so laut du kannst): Olaf Heine
 Cover design: Dirk Rudolph

See also
 List of certified albums in Romania

References

2005 debut albums
German-language albums
Tokio Hotel albums
European Border Breakers Award-winning albums